The 1933 Army Cadets football team represented the United States Military Academy in the 1933 college football season. In their first year under head coach Garrison H. Davidson, the Cadets compiled a 9–1 record, shut out seven of their ten opponents, and outscored all opponents by a combined total of 227 to 26.  In the annual Army–Navy Game, the Cadets defeated the Midshipmen  In the final game of the season at Yankee Stadium, the undefeated Cadets were upset by struggling Notre Dame,  
 
Four Army players were recognized on the All-America team. Halfback Jack Buckler received first-team honors from the Associated Press (AP), United Press (UP), Newspaper Enterprise Association (NEA), Central Press Association (CP), and New York Sun.  Quarterback Paul Johnson received second-team honors from the AP and NEA.  Guard Harvey Jablonsky received second-team honors from the NEA, CP, and International News Service (INS). End Peter James Kopcsak received third-team honors from the CP.

Schedule

References

Army
Army Black Knights football seasons
Army Cadets football